The 2011 Dahsyatnya Awards was an awards show for Indonesian musicians. It was the third annual show. It was held on January 26, 2011, at the Jakarta International Expo in Kemayoran, Central Jakarta, and was hosted by Raffi Ahmad, Olga Syahputra, Marcel Chandrawinata, Denny Cagur, Olla Ramlan, Laura Basuki, Jessica Iskandar, Ade Namnung and Tiffany Orie. The awards ceremonies will held theme for "Unlimited".

Afgan, Andien, Marcell, Nidji, and Vierra led the nominations with three categories, followed by Mulan Jameela and Sherina Munaf with two nominations.

Performers

Presenters
 Raffi Ahmad and Olga Syahputra – Presented Outstanding Newcomer
 Raffi Ahmad and Olga Syahputra – Presented Outstanding Stage Act
 Raffi Ahmad and Olga Syahputra – Presented Outstanding Solo Singer
 Jessica Iskandar, Raffi Ahmad and Olga Syahputra – Presented Outstanding Duo/Group Singer
 Franda and Limbad – Presented Outstanding City
 Raffi Ahmad and Olga Syahputra – Presented Outstanding Figure
 Raffi Ahmad, Luna Maya and Olga Syahputra – Presented Outstanding Most Diligently Perform Artist
 Firdaus, Raffi Ahmad and Olga Syahputra – Presented Outstanding Video Clip Director
 Raffi Ahmad and Olga Syahputra – Presented Outstanding Role in Video Clip
 Raffi Ahmad, Luna Maya and Olga Syahputra – Presented Outstanding Song

Winners and nominees
Winners are listed first and highlighted on boldface.

SMS

Jury

References

2011 music awards
Dahsyatnya Awards
Indonesian music awards